Talent Chawapiwa (born June 3, 1992) is a Zimbabwean professional footballer who played as a winger for the Zimbabwe national team.

Club career
Chawapiwa's career started in 2013 with capital club Harare City, where he remained until 2016 when he completed a transfer to ZPC Kariba after rejecting a new contract from Harare. In early 2017, Chawapiwa joined Platinum. Seven months into the year, Chawapiwa left Zimbabwean football for the first time to join South African Premier Division side Baroka. He made his debut on 19 August in a league game against Polokwane City. Chawapiwa scored his first professional goal on 29 October in a tie against Cape Town City in the 2017 Telkom Knockout. AmaZulu signed Chawapiwa in January 2019. He scored in March versus Free State Stars.

International career
During his career, Chawapiwa has made twenty-six appearances and scored five goals for the Zimbabwe national team. He was selected by Sunday Chidzambwa for the 2019 Africa Cup of Nations in Egypt.

Career statistics

Club
.

International
.

International goals
Scores and results list Zimbabwe's goal tally first.

Honours
Zimbabwe
 COSAFA Cup (2): 2017, 2018

Baroka
 Telkom Knockout: 2018

References

External links

1992 births
Living people
Place of birth missing (living people)
Zimbabwean footballers
Zimbabwe international footballers
Association football midfielders
Zimbabwean expatriate footballers
Expatriate soccer players in South Africa
Zimbabwean expatriate sportspeople in South Africa
Zimbabwe Premier Soccer League players
South African Premier Division players
Harare City F.C. players
F.C. Platinum players
Baroka F.C. players
AmaZulu F.C. players
Sekhukhune United F.C. players
2019 Africa Cup of Nations players
Zimbabwe youth international footballers